Isa Chandra Moskowitz is an American vegan chef, cookbook author, former host of the vegan community access cooking show Post Punk Kitchen, and restaurateur. Her first restaurant, Modern Love, opened in Omaha in 2014 and a second location opened in Brooklyn in 2016.

Biography
Raised in Brooklyn, New York, and having dropped out of The High School of Music & Art, where she majored in fine art, Moskowitz found herself drawn toward the punk rock scene of the Lower East Side of Manhattan in the late 1980s, embracing first a vegetarian diet, then veganism.  She also volunteered with Food Not Bombs. an anarchist organization that provides free vegan meals to the homeless and needy.

The inspiration to create her own cooking show came while watching the Food Network and wondering to herself why there were no vegan shows. According to Moskowitz, the show used the title The Post Punk Kitchen to signify the feeling of being "older and facing the conundrum of growing up and making compromises that their eighteen-year-old selves might hate them for". The success of The Post Punk Kitchen led to the compilation of a cookbook, Vegan with a Vengeance, in late  2005, and a number of additional cookbooks over the years.

In April 2008, she relocated from New York to Portland, Oregon, then to Omaha, Nebraska. Her restaurant, Modern Love, has locations in Omaha and Brooklyn.Post Punk Kitchen's Isa Chandra Moskowitz Talks Opening Modern Love in Brooklyn

Activism
  
Moskowitz is a vocal opponent of "humane meat", promoting animal rights through what she calls "Culinary Activism" or "Baketivism":

I think that activism isn't what you decide to do but how it affects people. So if someone says, I'm going to become an activist! I'm going to stand on a street corner and preach about veganism! And then they go ahead and do that but no one listens and no one becomes vegan, then is that activism? On the other hand, maybe there's a girl in the middle of nowhere who loves animals and decided to bake vegan. And then people taste her cupcakes and are like "What the hell, I'll go vegan, too." Obviously, I think the latter is more effective, but I guess people might not see it as activism.

After the 2010 Haiti earthquake, Moskowitz posted on her blog a call for vegans to host bake sales in their home cities to fundraise for relief which resulted in over $75,000 being raised.

Publications
Cookbooks
Vegan with a Vengeance. 2005. 
Vegan Cupcakes Take Over the World, with Terry Hope Romero. 2006. 
Veganomicon, with Terry Hope Romero. 2007. 
Vegan Brunch. 2009. 
Vegan Cookies Invade Your Cookie Jar, with Terry Hope Romero. 2009. 
Appetite for Reduction. 2010. 
Vegan Pie in the Sky. 2011. 

Vegan with a Vengeance, 10th Anniversary Edition: Over 150 Delicious, Cheap, Animal-Free Recipes That Rock. 2015. 
The Superfun Times Vegan Holiday Cookbook: Entertaining for Absolutely Every Occasion. 2016. 
I Can Cook Vegan. 2019. 

Articles
10 Essential Pantry Staples, According to Chefs, Vegetarian Times, May 17, 2022.
Don’t fear the vegan at your Thanksgiving table, CNN, November 21, 2014.

See also
Animal rights and punk subculture

Notes

External links

 
 Isa Chandra Moskowitz - CNBC Make It

1973 births
Living people
American food writers
20th-century American Jews
Chefs of vegan cuisine
Punk writers
Writers from Brooklyn
American television chefs
American veganism activists
American women chefs
Vegan cookbook writers
Chefs from New York City
21st-century American non-fiction writers
21st-century American women writers
American women non-fiction writers
21st-century American Jews
20th-century American women
Women in punk